Yunnanilus altus is a species of ray-finned fish, a stone loach, in the genus Yunnanilus from Yunnan. It occurs in small streams with a moderate current where it moves slowly in shoals along the substrate. Its diet consists of filamentous algae and insects. The type locality is in Zhanyi County.

References

A
Taxa named by Maurice Kottelat
Taxa named by Chu Xin-Luo
Fish described in 1988